Hammer of the Gods (also known as Thor: Hammer of the Gods) is a 2009 made-for-TV film, starring Zachery Ty Bryan, directed by Todor "Toshko" Chapkanov and produced by Jeffery Beach and Phillip J. Roth for the Syfy channel. It tells the story of the thunder god Thor, after he defeated the Midgard Serpent and died, then was reincarnated into a mortal man. Thor, along with his two brothers and friends travel to a mysterious island at Midgard's edge, seeking glory and fame. Upon arriving they encounter strange creatures and they start searching the island for answers. Meanwhile, Thor keeps seeing visions of a mighty warrior and a big hammer and Freyja tells him that his visions are clues. So they start searching for the hammer.

Plot
Thor follows his brother Baldur and a band of Norsemen on a voyage that leads them to the shores of a mysterious new land. While there, the group encounters a settlement filled with villagers living in mortal fear of a pack of werewolves that have taken over the surrounding forest. The whole time, Thor is plagued with visions of a mysterious warrior wielding a mighty hammer. He believes Baldur is destined to wield such a weapon and become a legendary hero until he witnesses his brother's death at the hands of the werewolves who follow the monstrous god Fenris. Thor takes command of the surviving Norsemen, culminating in a showdown between Fenris and Thor, armed with the one weapon that can kill Fenris once and for all: Mjölnir.

Cast
Zachery Ty Bryan as Thor
Alexis Peters as Sif
Mac Brandt as Baldur
Daz Crawford as Ulfrich
Melissa Osborne as Freyja
Vladimir Kolev as Hermoid
Raicho Vasilev as Heimdall
Nicole Ennemoser as Hel
George Zlatarev as Vali / The Narrator
Hristo Mitzkov as Garmur
John Laskowski as Hodur
Maxim Genchev as Bragi
Richie Manteliev as Vidar
Lazar Radkov as Borr
Velislav Pavlov as Aegir
Peter Meltev as Freyr
Rafael Jordan as Campfire Viking

Critical reception

Richard Cross of 20/20 Movie Reviews.com, lamented the film's poor writing, characters, production quality and filming of action sequences.

Production
Hammer of the Gods was filmed in Sofia, Bulgaria during January 2008.

References

External links
 
 

2009 television films
2009 films
Syfy original films
Films about Thor
Films set in the Viking Age
Films scored by Lucas Vidal
2000s American films